David Drew Zingg (December 14, 1923 – July 28, 2000) was an American photographer and journalist. He spent nearly forty years in Brazil (mostly split between Rio de Janeiro and São Paulo), beginning in 1964, becoming an important figure in the cultural life of the both cities and the bossa nova movement of the 1960s.

David Zingg was born in Montclair, New Jersey on December 14, 1923. He studied at Columbia University in New York City, majoring in history and literature, where he later gave classes in journalism. He worked in the newsroom of NBC, and volunteered for the U.S. Army Air Force in the Second World War. He was based in England. After he was grounded, he became a war correspondent in France and Germany for the Armed Services Radio.

Zingg was married to Elizabeth Foulk c.1950. Together they had three sons, Peter (b. 1951), Christopher (b. 1955), and Drew (b. 1957). The couple divorced in 1968.
During 1950 to 1952 he was the editor of the United Fruit Company house organ Unifruitco.
In New York City, Zingg was an editor, writer and reporter for Look and Life magazines. He became a free-lance photographer during that period.

Although he was based in New York, Zingg traveled the world and contributed text and photographs to a long list of publications including Look, Life, Esquire, Show, Town and Country, GQ, Sports Illustrated, Vogue, Interview, El Paseante, Zoom, Modern Photography, Popular Photography, The New York Times, the London Sunday Times, the  Sunday Telegraph and The Observer.

He covered many famous celebrities, such as John F. Kennedy, Winston Churchill, Che Guevara, Marcel Duchamp, Lawrence Durrell, Louis Armstrong, Duke Ellington, Bobby Short and Ella Fitzgerald.

In 1959, Zingg landed in Rio de Janeiro as a crew member on the Buenos Aires-Rio Ocean Race, which he had also covered for Life and Sports Illustrated.

Enamored with Brazil, Zingg began to shuttle back and forth between Rio and New York . His coverage of Brazil's development, including the construction of Brasilia, appeared in various US and British publications. On a four-month assignment covering the arts in South America for Show: The Magazine of the Arts'', he was present at the opening night of the Bossa Nova show featuring Tom Jobim and Vinicius de Moraes at Rio's Bom Gourmet Club. He was instrumental in arranging for the seminal 1962 concert of Bossa Nova at New York's Carnegie Hall.

In December 1964, Zingg came to Rio to do a photographic essay for Look Magazine. Zingg did not leave after the shoot, and after three months, he moved out of the legendary Copacabana Palace hotel to the home of the Carioca architect, Sergio Bernardes.

After taking up his own residence in Rio, he began to photograph for Adolfo Bloch's Manchete magazine. In his Carioca phase, Zingg photographed several films of the Cinema Novo movement. In a short time, Roberto Civita invited him to become part of the team which was producing the innovative monthly magazine, Realidade. In 1978 Zingg moved from Rio de Janeiro to São Paulo.

In the almost 40 years of this residence in Brazil, he photographed for a variety of Brazilian magazines, as well as having been a columnist for a number of them. From 1987 until his death in 2000, he worked at the Folha de S.Paulo newspaper, where he wrote a column entitled "Tio Dave" (Portuguese for "Uncle Dave").

David also played a role in the "punk-big-small-pop-rock" band Joelho de Porco with his friend Tico Terpins. A great contribution for the culture of São Paulo underground art-music scene.

David Drew Zingg died on July 28, 2000, in São Paulo, Brazil, of multiple organ failure, after complications resulting from a prostate surgery a month earlier.

David Zingg is survived by his three sons and five grandchildren.

References
  Site with bio, pictures and more, last updated prior to his death. His bio was adapted from this site.
   ISTOÉ Gente obituary.

External links
  Barbra Streisand as photographed by David Drew Zingg.
  Sports Illustrated cover photo with John F. Kennedy, shot by Zingg

20th-century American photographers
1923 births
2000 deaths
United States Army Air Forces soldiers
United States Army Air Forces personnel of World War II
Deaths from multiple organ failure
American expatriates in Brazil
Columbia College (New York) alumni